G Data CyberDefense AG (until September 2019 G Data Software AG) is a German software company that focuses on computer security. The company was founded in 1985 and is headquartered in Bochum. They are known for being the creators of the world's first antivirus software. G Data uses multiple scanning engines; one is developed in-house and the other is the Bitdefender engine. G Data provides several security products that are targeted at home and business markets. The company has a North American subsidiary located in Newark, Delaware.

History

G Data was founded in Bochum, Germany, in 1985. The company introduced its first computer security product Anti-Virus Kit (AVK) in 1988 for Atari ST.

Beside focus on the security market, G Data also created software for voice recognition (Invox) and speech synthesis (Logox).

G Data computer security products use two scan engines, originally by Avast and Bitdefender. The 2014 release introduced their own scan engine (CloseGap), which replaced Avast. However, the upgrade to new version was not painless, as users of weaker computers experienced system slowdowns. The company promptly solved this issue by issuing another update.

In September 2015, G Data launched a new messaging app called Secure Chat which used the Signal Protocol. The application was based on a fork of Signal and its source code was published under the GPLv3 license. G Data discontinued the service in May 2018.

Features 
Some of the features that G Data's solutions support are:
 Safe surfing
 Safe shopping
 Safe emailing and chatting
 Protection against spyware
 Safe online banking
 Blocks spam
 Protection against hacking
 Parental controls
 Data backup
 Data recovery
 Security tuning
 Data safe
 Device control
 Safe emailing and chatting
 BankGuard

Versions 
 Home Security
AntiVirus
InternetSecurity
TotalSecurity
AntiVirus for Mac
 Business Security
AntiVirus Business
AntiVirus Enterprise
ClientSecurity Business
ClientSecurity Enterprise
EndpointProtection Business
EndpointProtection Enterprise
MailSecurity
PatchManagement
 Mobile Security
 VPN

Awards and tests 
 av-comparatives.org
Gold award for highest detection rate of products tested (99.7%)
Gold award for highest proactive detection rate of new/unknown malware (~61%, with 20 false positives)
 IPACSO Innovation Framework for ICT-Security
Innovative Cyber Security Company

See also 

 Comparison of antivirus software
 Comparison of computer viruses

References 

Computer security software companies
Computer security companies
Antivirus software
Software companies of Germany
Information technology companies of Germany
Windows security software
MacOS security software
Android (operating system) software
iOS software
Companies established in 1985
1985 establishments in Germany
Companies based in Bochum
German brands
Privately held companies of Germany
Technology companies of Germany